Invest Atlanta is the City of Atlanta's Development Authority. It is also known by its previous name, the Atlanta Development Authority.

Invest Atlanta consists of the Urban Residential Finance Authority, Downtown Development Authority and the Atlanta Economic Renaissance Corporation, along with the subsidiary, Atlanta BeltLine, Inc.

It is the official economic development authorityfor the City of Atlanta, and describes its mission as "to strengthen Atlanta’s economy and global competitiveness in order to create increased opportunity and prosperity for the people of Atlanta."

Invest Atlanta is Governed by a nine-member board of directors, chaired by the Mayor of Atlanta, and states that it "creates programs and initiatives focused on developing and fostering public-private partnerships to accelerate job creation/economic growth, neighborhood revitalization/investment, and innovation/entrepreneurship". using economic tools such as "bond financing, revolving loan funds, housing financing, tax increment financing and tax credits".

In 2012 the ADA rebranded as Invest Atlanta.

References

External links

Government of Atlanta
Economic development organizations in the United States